Villa Luganese is a quarter of the city of Lugano, Switzerland. 

Villa Luganese was formerly a municipality of its own, having been incorporated into Lugano in 2008.

References

External links
 
 Official site of the quarter

Former municipalities of Ticino
Districts of Lugano